The National Open Pairs was the first national bridge championship for open pairs and was held at the fall American Contract Bridge League (ACBL) North American Bridge Championship (NABC) as a four-session matchpoint (MP) pairs event.

History

Inaugurated in 1928 and contested for the Cavendish Trophy, the event lost its national rating after the 1962 NABCs being displaced by the Blue Ribbons Pairs event, renamed the Edgar Kaplan Blue Ribbon Pairs in 1999. The Open Pairs carried on as a secondary event at fall NABCs until 1971 when it was discontinued.

Winners

Two Open Pairs champions successfully defended that title: Willard Karn–P. Hal Sims in 1932 and Helen Sobel–Margaret Wagar in 1948. The last winner of the Open Pairs as a premier event, B. Jay Becker–Dorothy Hayden in 1962, also won the first Blue Ribbon Pairs in 1963. No other partnership won the Open Pairs twice.

Jane and Lewis M. Jaeger won the Open Pairs as a married couple in 1945; they were also the first married couple to become Life Masters.

Since Sobel and Wagar won in 1947 and 1948, no pair of women has won either the Fall National Open Pairs to 1962 or the Blue Ribbon Pairs from 1963. Mary Jane Farell and Marilyn Johnson alone won the equally prestigious Life Master Pairs as partners, in 1978.

See also
 Edgar Kaplan Blue Ribbon Pairs, or Blue Ribbon Pairs, successor as premier event

Notes

Sources

 "Search Results: Open Pairs (1928–1962)". ACBL. Visit "NABC Winners"; select a Discontinued NABC.  
 "Search Results: Open Pairs (1963–1971)". ACBL. Visit NABC Winners; select a Discontinued NABC.  

North American Bridge Championships